Mount Ritchie is a mountain rising over 1600 m in the southeast part of Warren Range, Antarctica. Named by the Victoria University of Wellington Antarctic Expedition (VUWAE), 1970–71, after A. Ritchie, curator of fossils at the Australian Museum, Sydney, a member of the VUWAE party that discovered important sites of fossil fish in this Skelton Neve area.
 

Mountains of Oates Land